D'Alelio is a surname. Notable people with the surname include:

Massimo D'Alelio (1916–1998), Italian bridge player
Sarah D'Alelio (born 1980), American mixed martial artist